Daniel Alberto González (born 26 January 1991) is an Argentine professional footballer who plays as a left midfielder for Mitre.

Career
González began his senior career in 2008 with Fénix in Primera C. Three years into his career, the club were relegated to the 2011–12 Primera D; a season that González scored six goals in thirty games in. Back-to-back promotions followed from Primera D to Primera B Metropolitana. In Primera B Metropolitana, González made his professional debut on 13 August 2013 in a loss to Temperley. He scored his first senior goal in October vs. Flandria. He made thirty-nine appearances and scored twice in 2013–14. On 1 July 2014, González joined Argentine Primera División side Godoy Cruz. Fifteen appearances followed over two seasons.

In July 2015, González signed for fellow Primera División team San Martín. His debut came on 19 July against Huracán. He played five times during 2015, before featuring thirteen times in 2016; in his first appearance of 2016, González scored his first San Martín goal in a 2–2 draw away to Racing Club. One year after joining San Martín, in July 2016, González made a move to join Temperley. After twelve matches in 2016–17, he left to play for Defensa y Justicia. His first appearance for Defensa came during the 2017 Copa Sudamericana versus Chapecoense on 25 July. In early 2018, González joined Mitre of Primera B Nacional on loan.

González, after three goals in thirty-four matches with Mitre across eighteen months, headed off abroad for the first time in June 2019 by agreeing terms with Dorados de Sinaloa of Ascenso MX. His debut arrived in a league win away to Tampico Madero on 2 August, which preceded González notching his first goal on 13 August during a Copa MX encounter with Necaxa.

Career statistics
.

Honours
Fénix
Primera D: 2011–12

References

External links

1991 births
Living people
Sportspeople from Buenos Aires Province
People from General Rodríguez Partido
Argentine footballers
Association football midfielders
Argentine expatriate footballers
Expatriate footballers in Mexico
Argentine expatriate sportspeople in Mexico
Primera C Metropolitana players
Primera D Metropolitana players
Primera B Metropolitana players
Argentine Primera División players
Primera Nacional players
Ascenso MX players
Club Atlético Fénix players
Godoy Cruz Antonio Tomba footballers
San Martín de San Juan footballers
Club Atlético Temperley footballers
Defensa y Justicia footballers
Club Atlético Mitre footballers
Nueva Chicago footballers
Dorados de Sinaloa footballers
San Martín de Tucumán footballers